Kellum is a surname. Notable people with the surname include:

Bill Kellum, American musician
Brandon Kellum (born 1985), American musician
Echo Kellum (born 1982), American actor and comedian
John Kellum (1809–1871), American architect
Marv Kellum (1952-2023), American football player
Win Kellum (1876–1951), Canadian baseball player

See also
Kellum Creek, a river of Pennsylvania, United States
John Kellum, VP JP Morgan